NSW Ambulance, previously the Ambulance Service of NSW, is an agency of NSW Health and the statutory provider of pre-hospital emergency care and ambulance services in the state of New South Wales, Australia.

NSW Ambulance employs more than 6,100 staff including 4,952 paramedics who operate over 1,600 response vehicles from 220 locations across the state. The service responds to around 1.1 million calls a year, with an average response time of 7.47 minutes to 1A emergencies (cardiac or respiratory arrests), against a target of 10 minutes.

History 

The first recognised ambulance service in New South Wales, known as the Civil Ambulance and Transport Brigade, commenced operations on April 1, 1895. Their first ambulance station was a borrowed police station in Railway Square, Sydney, which was staffed by two permanent officers. At the time, patients were transported on hand-held stretchers and hand-litters. As demand grew, so did the service and they were soon transporting over 2,000 patients a year. In 1905, they were reorganised into the Ambulance Transport Corps. In 1910, they opened their first station on the west side of the city, occupying the former parcels office at Summer Hill Railway Station. 

In 1912, the first motorised ambulance entered service with the Corps, followed by two ambulance trams in 1915. The service was then renamed the NSW Ambulance Transport Service Board in 1921, with further technological advances such as the installation of radios in ambulance vehicles by the mid 1930s. By 1937, the Central District ambulance fleet had grown to 15 vehicles, with many others operating in districts across the state.
  
In 1958, the first fibreglass body ambulances entered service, marking a significant advancement in the design towards the modern ambulance. In 1962, Station Officer Jim Smith (a former rigger at the Port Kembla Steelworks) became the first rescue trained ambulance officer in NSW. He received training from the existing Police Rescue Squad, and subsequently commenced operations on the service's new 'Q' (Rescue) Van. In 1967, the Air Ambulance Service was established, operating a single Beechcraft Queen Air B80.  Over the next ten years, this would grow to a fleet of five aircraft. In 1970, the service purchased 45 new Ford F100 ambulances, which would become the face of the fleet for many years to come. By the late 1970s and 1980s, Intensive Care Paramedics were introduced, allowing the service to bring unprecedented levels of pre-hospital care to patients. In 1985, the Air Ambulance fleet received further upgrades with four new King Air B200C's.

As the importance of pre-hospital care skyrocketed in the service, the Special Casualty Access Team (SCAT) was formed in 1986. This team of elite paramedics brought intensive care to patients in the most extreme of situations, ranging from cliff falls to building collapses. SCAT Paramedics were trained in a range of skills including climbing, winching, breathing apparatus, CBRNE, caving, canyoning, USAR, bushcraft, four wheel driving and wilderness survival. A major step forward for the service came in 1991, when every ambulance in NSW was equipped with a defibrillator. In 2004, both immediate and long distance care were enhanced across NSW, with the purchase of new rapid response cars and new Air Ambulances (four King Air 200s). The late 2000s saw vast increases to the service's specialist capabilities, with the creation of the Medical Retrieval Unit, the Special Operations Team and the Extended Care Program, making the service one of the most advanced providers of pre-hospital care in the world.

Paramedics 

Primary Care Paramedics form the backbone of NSW Ambulance. They provide the bulk of frontline care, responding to all types of emergencies across the state. Paramedics are trained in a broad variety of medical skills, gained through either a NSW Ambulance diploma or a degree in Paramedicine.

Intensive Care Paramedics (ICP) are highly skilled and experienced paramedics, who provide advanced intensive patient care. Their extensive experience and training allows them to conduct advanced medical procedures in the field and administer specialist drugs to seriously ill or injured patients.

Extended Care Paramedics (ECP) are specialist paramedics who take a ‘GP’ type approach to non emergency incidents. Their role is to ease the workload of emergency ambulance crews by dealing with non emergency incidents using specialist training and techniques. These include prescribing medication, changing catheters, resetting dislocations etc. among many other skills.

Critical Care Paramedics (CCP) are elite paramedics assigned to the Medical Retrieval Unit. As well as intensive care skills, they're trained in Special Operations, allowing them to work in hostile environments such as building collapses, floods, caves, cliffs and remote bushland. They also have the ability to perform complex medical procedures and administer highly specialist drugs in the field to patients, under the authorisation of a Critical Care Doctor.

Duty Operations Managers (DOM) are senior paramedic inspectors responsible for supervising clinical operations and managing crews on shift across each ambulance zone. They provide an experienced oversight at complex medical incidents, supporting paramedics with patient management and treatment. DOMs are generally qualified Intensive Care Paramedics, with a strong background of medical experience and leadership.

Community First Responders (CFR) are part-time and volunteer members of other emergency services trained in advanced medical skills, who respond to medical emergencies in conjunction with Paramedics in remote areas of the state. There are 33 CFR units in total; 11 Fire and Rescue NSW, 11 NSW State Emergency Service and 12 Rural Fire Service, with each unit generally carrying their complement of medical equipment on board existing response vehicles such as fire engines.

Response Priorities 
NSW Ambulance prioritise cases into several priority levels based on the urgency of the case, which are categorised into:

 Priority 1 - Lights and Sirens Response
 1A (Highest Priority) - Patient not breathing
 1B (High Priority) - Patient unconscious
 1C (Priority) - Urgent response required
 Priority 2 - Response without Lights and Sirens
 2I - Immediate attendance required
 2A - Attend within 30 minutes
 2B - Attend within 60 minutes
 Priority 3 - Urgent Medical Transfer (Can be upgraded to Lights and Sirens depending on situation)
 The remainder of the priority levels are made up of various priority transfers.

As of early 2019, NSW Ambulance attended over two thirds of Priority 1 calls within 30 minutes.

Special Operations 
The Special Operations Team (SOT) are responsible for specialised ambulance operations across the state. Their role is to bring Paramedic level care to patients any kind of hostile environment including cliffs, canyons, caves, floods, bushfires, building collapses, confined spaces, hazardous materials incidents, active shooters and the remote Australian wilderness.

SOT operate on a day to day basis from rapid response vehicles spread across Sydney, Wollongong and the Central Coast, located at St Ives, Bankstown, Macquarie Fields, Caringbah, Point Clare, Wollongong and Northmead. They additionally operate a number of specialist vehicles from their Special Operations Base at Bankstown, including 4WD Ambulances and numerous specialist support vehicles.

In some rural areas of Regional NSW, SOT are trained and equipped as primary rescue units, allowing them to extricate patients in addition to their medical access role. They operate six rescues, based at Wagga Wagga, Singleton, Tamworth, Bomaderry, Cowra and Rutherford, with two spare vehicles located in Sydney. These rescues are equipped with a range of rescue tools including battery extrication equipment and rope rescue gear. In the winter months, the Alpine Operations Team is active, based at Perisher Valley, this specialised team of 20 paramedics provide patient access and care to the entire NSW Alpine region. The Alpine Operations Team utilises unconventional vehicles to access patients, from snowmobiles to over-snow ambulances and their paramedics are specifically trained in overnight camping, search and rescue and avalanche recovery.

Medical Retrieval 

The Medical Retrieval Unit (MRU) (through the Rapid Launch Trauma Centre) are responsible for the coordination and response of NSW Ambulance's Medical Retrieval Teams. Each Medical Team consists of a Doctor and a Critical Care Paramedic, who work together to bring the highest level of pre hospital clinical care to patients. Medical Teams can perform a number of complex medical procedures beyond the scope of Primary and Intensive Care Paramedics

Its operates from six bases across NSW, located at Bankstown, Albion Park, Orange, Belmont, Tamworth and Lismore, along with Hume in the Australia Capital Territory.

Each Medical Team primarily operates from a specially equipped Agusta AW139 helicopter. Two aircraft operate from Bankstown, with one aircraft attached to each of the other bases. A third helicopter is operated from Bankstown as a NETS (Newborn & Paediatric Emergency Transport Service) aircraft. Each helicopter aircrew consists of a Pilot and a Crewman. The Teams also have access to a numerous specialist vehicles for road based responses, including Ambulances and 4WD response vehicles. The helicopters are managed and maintained on a contract basis by Toll (Southern Bases) and Westpac (Northern Bases).

An additional medical team are based out of Westmead Hospital in Sydney, who are operated by the not for profit organisation Careflight. They operate an Airbus H-145 and respond in conjunction with NSW Ambulance's other medical teams across the state.

The Air Ambulance Service also conduct long distance inter hospital patient transport, ensuring the continuation high level medical care between hospitals during transit. Based at Sydney its operates five Beechcraft Super King Air aircraft. Additional Fixed-Wing ambulances also operate in Dubbo and Broken Hill as part of a contract with Royal Flying Doctor Service.

Fleet 
Emergency Ambulances

The primary response vehicle of NSW Ambulance is the Mercedes-Benz Sprinter. Run by both General Duties and Intensive Care crews, Sprinters make up the large majority of the ambulance fleet across the state. A number of rural areas previously used Volkswagen Transporters, but these have now been replaced. Some rural stations also operate Toyota Landcruiser Troopcarriers which are configured for patient transport and are used to access patients in difficult and remote terrain. The Troopcarrier 4WD vehicles have an after market side access door on the left hand side for paramedic access into the treatment cabin.

Multi Purpose Vehicles (MPVs)

MPVs are large custom built Mercedes Sprinters, which are equipped to deal with large complex bariatric patients. The rear patient transport area of the vehicle is significantly larger than a standard emergency ambulance, and is also equipped with specialist casualty loading and patient management gear, such as mechanical lifting equipment. As well as bariatric patients, the vehicles are also highly beneficial for patients undergoing hospital transfers who require specialist equipment such as life support machines to travel with them in the ambulance.

Extended Care Paramedics (ECPs)

ECPs operate a fleet of Hyundai iLoads and Kia Sorento's which are fitted out with an extensive range of extended care equipment. These vehicles are unable to transport patients, instead they provide extensive specialised treatment to patients on-scene, minimising the number of patient transports to hospital with their significant range of equipment.

Paramedic Immediate Care Units (PICUs)

PICU's provide rapid response to emergencies across Metropolitan NSW, utilising a range of Holden Captiva's, and Kia Sorento's. Staffed with a mix of GD and IC Paramedics, they're able to provide immediate lifesaving care to patients in the busy areas of Sydney and Newcastle. NSW Ambulance also operate three Motorcycles, staffed by IC Paramedics, which are able to negotiate the tight and congested areas of Sydney's inner city.

Duty Operations Managers (DOMs)

DOM's operate a range of response vehicles, predominantly SUV's and Utilities, which allow them to respond rapidly to incidents and provide immediate on site expertise and oversight. Each vehicle carries an array of medical equipment similar to a PICU, allowing them to perform patient care when required (such as arriving on scene at an incident before an ambulance crew or assisting with multiple patients). The wide fleet of vehicles used by DOM's includes Holden Captiva's, Holden Colorado's, Holden Trailblazer's, Toyota Prado's, Isuzu MUX's, Isuzu D-Max's and Kia Sorento's.

Over Snow Vehicles

Perisher Valley Ambulance Station operate a fleet of over snow vehicles, including a Hägglunds all terrain vehicle, a Kässbohrer Geländefahrzeug over snow vehicle, two Yamaha snowmobiles, a 4WD Quad Bike and trailer and a 4WD Mercedes Sprinter, which allow paramedics to access the alpine areas of the Snowy Mountains.

Special Operations Team (SOT)

SOT operate custom built Holden Colorado's as their primary response vehicles, which are fitted out with an equipment pod that allow them to carry specialist equipment such as cordage (rope) and breathing apparatus. Each vehicle is also fitted out with an array of medical equipment, allowing them to provide treatment to patients. SOT also operate Toyota Landcruisers for special operations work such as major incident deployments, which are often double crewed.

They also operate a number of specialist support vehicles from the Special Operations HQ at Bankstown including;

– Forward Control Vehicle (Mercedes Sprinter fitted out as a mobile forward command post)

– Rescue Support Vehicle (Mercedes Sprinter fitted out with rescue and extrication gear, often used for training)

– Logistics Support Vehicle (Hino Truck used to carry bulk equipment and medical supplies)

– Major Incident Support Units (Two Mercedes Sprinters with custom bodies fitted out to carry major incident support equipment)

– SOT Multi Purpose Vehicle (Mercedes Sprinter MPV used for special operations)
Each of the six SOT Rescue Units is also assigned a Hino Rescue Truck. Each Rescue is equipped with a wide array of rescue and extrication equipment such as forcible entry gear, battery cutting tools and rope rescue gear among other equipment. Each truck also carries a complement of medical equipment similar to SOT Response Vehicles. A seventh Hino Rescue is kept in Sydney as a spare, in addition to the Mercedes support vehicle.

See also 

 Paramedics in Australia
 Ambulance
 Paramedic

References

External links 

 
 Air Ambulance Australia

Government agencies of New South Wales
Emergency services in New South Wales
Ambulance services in Australia
Medical and health organisations based in New South Wales
Ambulance stations in New South Wales